The 2008 Karbala bombing occurred on 17 March 2008 in Karbala, Iraq.

The suicide bomb detonated outside a cafe near the shrine. The bombings killed at least 22 people and injured 30. The dead include seven Iranians.

Background 
It is home to the Imam Husayn Shrine, one of the holiest sites of Shiite Islam. The city had seen several other suicide bombs in the past, including one in April 2007 that killed about 50 people.

There were two other insurgent attacks the day of the bombing, including a mortar attack and several suicide bombs, both in Baghdad. The attacks coincided with a visit by US Vice President Dick Cheney.

Perpetrator 
No group has claimed responsibility. Iraqi officials suspected al-Qaeda insurgents behind the bombing. The governor of Karbala province said the bomber had been a woman but gave few other details.

References 

2008 murders in Iraq
Mass murder in 2008
Suicide bombings in Iraq
Terrorist incidents in Iraq in 2008
Karbala
Violence against Shia Muslims in Iraq
March 2008 events in Iraq